Coleophora orphnoceros is a moth of the  family Coleophoridae. It is found in South Africa.

References

Endemic moths of South Africa
orphnoceros
Moths described in 1937
Moths of Africa